The Hamilton Derby was a Canadian Thoroughbred horse race first run on June 4, 1907 at the Hamilton Jockey Club Racetrack in Hamilton, Ontario. Open to three-year-old horses of either sex, it was contested over a distance of one and one-quarter miles on dirt.

Historical notes
The first four editions of the Hamilton Derby were won by Canadian-owned horses but passage of the Hart–Agnew anti-betting legislation in 1908 by the New York Legislature led to a compete shutdown of racing in 1911 and 1912 in that state. As a result, American owners began sending horses to compete in Canada and stalls at the Hamilton Jockey Club track were in great demand. The Hamilton Derby of 1911 saw only five starters, all of which were owned by Americans. Leading the way was Kentucky Derby winner Meridian plus the Derby runnerup Governor Gray, Richard Wilson Jr.'s Naushon, as well as the colt Pagod, owned by Lily A. Livingston, the former proprietor of the Rancocas Stud Farm and racing stable. It would be August Belmont Jr.'s Whist who would win the race under jockey Eddie Dugan. With American stables then competing regularly in the Hamilton Derby, it earned a good reputation as confirmed by a March 17, 1914 Daily Racing Form report that it was "always one of the great three-year-old races of the season" in Canada.

Records
Speed record:
 2:05 flat @ 1¼ : Whist (1911)

Most wins by a jockey:
 no jockey won this race more than once.

Most wins by a trainer:
 2 – John Whalen (1911, 1913)
 2 – William H. Bringloe (1921, 1925)

Most wins by an owner:
 2 – Seagram Stable (1921, 1925)

Winners

References

1907 establishments in Ontario
1967 disestablishments in Ontario
Horse races in Ontario
Discontinued horse races
Flat horse races for three-year-olds
Open middle distance horse races
Recurring sporting events established in 1907
Recurring sporting events disestablished in 1926